Vera Sergeyevna Andreyeva (also Vera Andreeva, ; born May 10, 1988 in Cheboksary) is a Russian amateur mountain biker. She represented her nation Russia, as a 20-year-old junior, at the 2008 Summer Olympics, and later finished second in the women's elite cross-country race at the 2012 Russian Mountain Biking Championships.

Andreeva qualified for the Russian squad, along with her teammate and top medal contender Irina Kalentieva, in the women's cross-country race at the 2008 Summer Olympics in Beijing by receiving one of the nation's two available berths based on her top-ten performance from the UCI Mountain Biking World Rankings. With two laps left to complete the race, Andreeva suffered a heat-related fatigue under Beijing's hot and humid weather, and instead decided to pull off from the course, finishing only in twenty-third place.

References

External links
NBC Olympics Profile

1988 births
Living people
Russian female cyclists
Cross-country mountain bikers
Cyclists at the 2008 Summer Olympics
Olympic cyclists of Russia
People from Cheboksary
Sportspeople from Chuvashia
20th-century Russian women
21st-century Russian women